Chavis Williams (born July 10, 1989) is the head football coach of the Dora Bulldogs in Dora, Alabama and a former American football linebacker. He played college football at Alabama.

High school career
Williams attended Dora High School, where he was ranked nationally by Scout.com as the No. 39 DE and No. 22 in Alabama entering college. Rated as a top 50 defensive linemen by Rivals.com. Selected first team All-State Class 4A by the Alabama Sports Writers Association. Finished second on his team with 123 tackles and added 11 sacks as a senior. Also played TE, posting 393 receiving yards and 6 touchdowns. Accumulated 81 tackles (averaging 9 per game) and 8 sacks as a junior.

College career
Williams appeared in 33 career games and produced 17 tackles in four years (2007–10) at Alabama. Earned a starting role in eight contests during his senior season, recording 12 tackles (5 solo) in 13 games. Also recorded Alabama's only blocked kick in 2010 and posted a career-high 3 stops against Penn State. Played in seven games with 2 tackles as a junior for the Crimson Tide in 2009, contributing mostly as a third-down pass rusher and on special teams. Served as a reserve LB as a sophomore in 2008, appearing in five contests mainly with special teams. Recorded 1 sack (-9 yards) against Clemson at the Georgia Dome. Appeared in eight games as a freshman in 2007 at both LB and on special teams, recording 2 tackles (1 solo).

Professional career
Williams was signed by the Baltimore Ravens as an undrafted free agent. He was later promoted from the practice squad to the active roster. On August 31, 2012 he was released.

Coaching career
On May 21, 2019, Williams was named head football coach at Carbon Hill High School in central Alabama where he led the team to the playoffs for the first time since 1999. He was named head football coach of his alma mater, Dora High School, on December 10, 2020.

References

External links
Baltimore Ravens bio
Alabama Crimson Tide bio

1989 births
Living people
American football linebackers
People from Walker County, Alabama
Players of American football from Alabama
Alabama Crimson Tide football players
Baltimore Ravens players